Sumarendra Nath Gupta (1887-1964) was an Indian artist and the principle of Mayo School of Arts, Lahore. He was one of the first batch of students of Abanindranath Tagore.

Selected publications

References

External links

Indian male painters
1964 deaths
Bengali Hindus
Artists from Kolkata
University of Calcutta alumni
Indian arts administrators
Indian portrait painters
20th-century Indian painters
1887 births
Painters from West Bengal
20th-century Indian male artists